Robert F. Graboyes is an economist, journalist, and musician at RFG Counterpoint, LLC in Alexandria, Virginia. Author of Fortress and Frontier in American Health Care and publisher of Bastiat's Window on Substack, he writes on the technology and politicization of healthcare. He has taught health economics and in 2014 received the Reason Foundation's Bastiat Prize for Journalism.

Education and teaching
Dr. Robert F. Graboyes earned his PhD in economics from Columbia University. He also earned master's degrees from Columbia University, Virginia Commonwealth University, and the College of William and Mary, as well as a bachelor's degree from the University of Virginia. He taught full-time at the University of Richmond and, over a 20-year period, also taught part-time at Virginia Commonwealth University, the University of Virginia, George Washington University, and George Mason University.

References

Living people
20th-century American economists
21st-century American economists
Federal Reserve economists
Columbia University alumni
Virginia Commonwealth University alumni
College of William & Mary alumni
University of Virginia alumni
University of Richmond faculty
Virginia Commonwealth University faculty
George Mason University faculty
American medical writers
Bastiat Prize winners
Economics writers
Year of birth missing (living people)